William Magarey may refer to:

William Ashley Magarey (1868–1929), South Australian lawyer, inaugural chairman of SAFA, originator of the Magarey Medal
William James Magarey, member of the South Australian House of Assembly for the district of West Torrens in the Ninth Parliament (1878-1881)